is a town located on Kikaijima, in Ōshima District, Kagoshima Prefecture, Japan.  There are reports in 2018 that the volcano is a supervolcano with multiple such eruptive phases in the past.

In June 2013 the town had an estimated population of 7,657 and a population density of 134 persons per km². The total area is 56.94 km². The economy of the town is based on sugar cane, shōchū refining, and seasonal tourism.

Geography
Kikai occupies all of the island of Kikaijima. The climate is classified as humid subtropical (Köppen climate classification Cfa) with very warm summers and mild winters. Precipitation is high throughout the year, but is highest in the months of May, June and September. The town is subject to frequent typhoons.

History
The village of Kikai  was established on 1 April 1908. It was upgraded to town status in 1941. As with all of the Amami Islands, the village came under the administration of the United States from 1 July 1946 to 25 December 1953.

Transport

Ports
Kikai Port
Soumachi Port

Airport
Kikai Airport

Notable residents 

 In 2018, the then-oldest person in the world, Nabi Tajima (born August 1900) died in a hospital in Kikai at age 117.

References

External links

  

Towns in Kagoshima Prefecture
Populated coastal places in Japan